Adam Brodsky is an American, locally popular anti-folk singer, from Philadelphia, Pennsylvania, United States.  In 2003, he attained the Guinness World Record for the Fastest Tour by Solo Performer with 50 shows in 50 states in 50 days.

Background
Brodsky frequently refers to himself as "the Dork", or "Dorkboy". To highlight this, he has a tattoo, similar to Robert Indiana's sculpture, portrayed in Philadelphia's LOVE Park, proclaiming him a DORK.  His songs typically feature self-deprecation, religion (especially Judaism), suicide, and rejection. His albums often include banter made between sets during performances.

His self-owned label is Permanent Records, which he started in the mid-1990s.  Among the artists who have recorded under it are Todd Young, Butch Ross, EDO, Greg Simon, Pete Chambers and Steph Hayes.

In 2000, he was named the Best Folk Performer in the Philadelphia City Paper Music Awards.  That year, he also developed a side project called, "A Brief History of Folk Music." Contrary to his raucous shows, it was primarily aimed at children.

Between August 3, 2003 and September 21, 2003, Brodsky set the Guinness World Record for the Fastest Tour by Solo Performer with 50 shows in 50 states in 50 days, and then performed in Washington DC the following night.

Brodsky allows audience members to record his live performances. In 2003, Mary Krause of Permanent Records gave permission for fan-made recordings of Brodsky's shows to be hosted on the Internet Archive.

Adam removed himself a self-imposed "hibernation" and went back on the road in April 2008 with shows in Hoboken, NJ; Boston, MA; Schenectady, NY and Ithaca, NY, with Steph Hayes from Steph Hayes and The Good Problems.

Discography
 Deeply Flawed
 Dork Radio EP
 Dork (1997)
 Folk Remedy (2000)
 Hookers, Hicks, and Heebs (2003)
 Under the Covers (promotional)
 "No More Luxuries", hidden track on the Jim Carroll Band Tribute, Put Your Tongue to the Rail (1999)

References

External links
 Official Site
  Adam Brodsky's page on MySpace
 Adam Brodsky collection at the Internet Archive's live music archive

Songwriters from Pennsylvania
Jewish American musicians
American male singers
Musicians from Philadelphia
Year of birth missing (living people)
Living people
Jewish anti-folk musicians
21st-century American Jews
American male songwriters